Kamala Beach or just Kamala refers to the beach and town on the west coast of Phuket, Thailand. It is one of the major tourist attractions in Phuket.

Geography

It is situated north of Patong, about 8 km, and at a distance of about half an hour from Phuket Airport via car. It has a long sandy curvy stretch of 3 km and usually a quiet atmosphere.

2004 Tsunami

On 26 December 2004, a tsunami wave caused by the Indian Ocean earthquake struck major west coast beaches of Phuket, and Kamala suffered severe damage.

Covid-19's effect

The Covid-19 Pandemic affected Phuket severely, including Kamala Beach. The quarantine majorly impacted country's tourism. The Minister of Tourism and Sports Phiphat Ratchakitprakarn, quoted "Phuket, Samui and Phi Phi -- among the first places to welcome inoculated tourists without quarantine before a wider national reopening -- are all smaller islands and will allow authorities to quickly curb movement if community transmission spikes. Proof of vaccination has been mandated to visit Phuket and other places.

Cock fighting/breeding

Cockfighting is illegal in Phuket, but Kamala Beach has become the center for breeding cock fight chicken in
Phuket. Many breeding centers are run by influential people, politicians, and local mafias. This has caused conflicts amongst landowners who share their borders with cock breeding centers because of the cocks’ crowing, and the corresponding decrease in the land’s financial value.

References 

Beaches of Phuket Province
Tourist attractions in Phuket province
Geography of Phuket province